Dirección de Observaciones Judiciales (Directorate of Judicial Surveillance, DOJ) is an Argentine intelligence service responsible for intercepting communications as required by judicial officers. It is part of the Secretaría de Inteligencia, the main intelligence agency; and is a subagency of the National Intelligence System. It is known as "Division 84" or "Ojota" inside SIDE. ("O-Jota" is the Spanish pronunciation of the letters OJ.)

Building
The DOJ is located in a tall, nondescript building on Ave. de los Incas 3834, in Buenos Aires.

Before moving into its own building it operated out of Telecom Argentina´s Belgrano facility.

Mishandling allegations

During the past few years, there have been allegations of budget mishandlings and phone interventions without a judicial request and authorization; and about SIDE's counterintelligence service also having the capability to intercept communications.

See also
Secretariat of Intelligence
National Intelligence System
National Intelligence School
Argentine intelligence agencies
National Directorate of Criminal Intelligence
National Directorate of Strategic Military Intelligence

External links
 Intelligence Reform Law 25.520
 Interior Security Law 24.059

Argentine intelligence agencies
Federal law enforcement agencies of Argentina